Žarko Laušević (born 19 January 1960) is a Montenegrin and Serbian actor. He became a leading actor early in his career. By the age of 33, he was a major star across the former Yugoslavia on both stage and screen.

Early years
Laušević was born on 19 January 1960, in Cetinje, SR Montenegro, SFR Yugoslavia. He got his first TV role at the age of eighteen. In 1982, immediately upon graduating from the University of Belgrade’s Academy of Theatrical Arts, he was cast in his first lead film role. Throughout the 1980s and 1990s, he received mostly lead roles in 25 movies, 17 TV shows and numerous theatrical productions across Yugoslavia. During this period, he became one of Yugoslavia's most popular movie and theatrical actors. He won the 1987 Golden Arena award for the film Oficir s ružom (The Officer with a Rose).

Shooting incident and legal troubles
In July 1993, Laušević entered into a quarrel with a group of local youths, together with his brother. This escalated into a fist fight, culminating in Laušević firing multiple rounds from his handgun, killing two of the youths and seriously wounding one. Sentenced by a Montenegrin (republic) court to prison initially, his conviction was overturned by the Yugoslav (appellate) court on the grounds that the first-instance court had improperly dismissed Laušević's self-defense argument, and the punishment was drastically reduced. Laušević served 4 years and 7 months in prison before his release. But he faced further legal battles. There were appeals by the Montenegrin prosecution, numerous retrials and inconsistent, ad hoc rulings by the Montenegrin court system. In 2001, the prison sentence was reinstated to 13 years by the Montenegrin courts.

In the late 1990s, Laušević left Yugoslavia for the United States. It is speculated that the move was made due to possible revenge by families of the deceased. He lived in the United States for two decades, returning to Serbia in 2014.

On December 29, 2011, Serbian president Boris Tadic gave Laušević amnesty from further charges regarding the 1993 double murder.

On February 1, 2012, Serbian deputy Prime Minister Ivica Dačić granted Laušević Serbian citizenship and passport.

Filmography
Aleksandar od Jugoslavije (2021) TV Series .... Nicholas I of Montenegro
Princ Rastko Srpski (2018) .... Stefan Nemanja
Volja sinovljeva (2018) .... Nikola
Senke nad Balkanom (2017) .... Princ Djordje P. Karadjordjevic
Smrdljiva bajka (2015) .... Moma
Nož (1999) .... Alija Osmanović/Ilija Jugović
Ranjena zemlja (1999)
Rođen kao ratnik (1994) .... Gibon
Kaži zašto me ostavi (1993) .... Peđa
Bolje od bekstva (1993)
Preci i potomci (1992) .... Narrator
Crni bombarder (1992) .... Šmajser
Montenegro (1991) (V)
Original falsifikata (1991) .... Stojan
Stela (1990) .... Mato Herceg
Baal (1990) (TV) .... Ekart
Zaboravljeni (1990) TV Series .... Aca 'Vena'
Kolubarska bitka (1990) (TV) .... Aleksa Dačić
Početni udarac (1990)
Atoški vrtovi - preobrazenje (1989) .... Sava slikar
Boj na Kosovu (1989) .... Miloš Obilić
Songlines (1989) (V) .... (video 'For a Million')
Braća po materi (1988) .... Braco Gavran
Camino del sur, El (1988) .... Moritz
The Fortunate Pilgrim" (1988) (mini) TV Series .... Guido
Vuk Karadžić .... Knez Mihailo Obrenović (4 episodes, 1988)
Putovanje (1988) TV Episode .... Knez Mihailo Obrenović
Vučići (1988) TV Episode .... Knez Mihailo Obrenović
Bratimstvo (1988) TV Episode .... Knez Mihailo Obrenović
Dobri hodi Crnoj Gori (1988) TV Episode .... Knez Mihailo Obrenović
Ranjenik (1988) (TV)
Leto (1988) (TV)
Oktoberfest (1987) .... Skobi
Pod ruševinama (1987) (TV)
Dogodilo se na današnji dan (1987) .... Bajra
Rimski Dan (1987) (TV) .... Sekst Propercije
Oficir s ružom (1987) .... Petar Horvat
Lepota poroka (1986) .... Mladić s cigaretom
Dobrovoljci (1986) .... Sportista
Šmeker (1986) .... Šmeker
Svečana obaveza (1986) (TV) .... Zoran Hadžikostić
Jagode u grlu (1985) .... Lale
Jedna polovina dana (1985) (TV)
Lazar (1984) .... Lazar
Sivi dom (1984) TV Series .... Šilja
Ne tako davno (1984) (mini) TV Series .... Srle 'Samac'
Oštrica brijača (1984) (TV)
Igmanski mars (1983) .... Miljan
Mrtvi se ne vraćaju (1983) (mini) TV Series
Dani AVNOJ-a (1983) (mini) TV Series
Hasanaginica (1983/I) (TV) .... Hasanaga
Podijum-Žarko Laušević (1983) (TV) .... Glumac
Ruski Umetnički eksperiment (1982) (TV) .... Tjomkin
Savamala (1982) .... Vinko Sarić
13. jul (1982) .... Janko 'Kvisling'
Progon (1982) .... Mirko
Direktan prenos (1982) .... Fantom
M.V. (1978) (TV) .... Vojin Vukelić

References

External links

Žarko Laušević se vraća u Srbiju?; MTS Mondo, February 6, 2009
Moja istina; NIN, 4 November 1999

Living people
1960 births
Serbian male actors
People from Cetinje
Serbs of Montenegro
Golden Arena winners
Zoran Radmilović Award winners